Nurredha Ibrahim Misuari is a Moro Filipino who is a member of the Bangsamoro Transition Authority Parliament.

Early life
She is born in Jolo, Sulu in December 1994 to Moro National Liberation Front (MNLF) founder Nur Misuari and Tarhata Ibrahim. Ibrahim is her father's third wife. She is the only child of Misuari to be born in Sulu.

Misuari attended elementary and high school in Quezon City. She graduated from St. Joseph's College in high school. For here collegiate studies, she attended the University of Immaculate Conception in Davao City where she obtained a degree in business administration in 2019 and graduated with magna cum laude honors.

Career

Moro National Liberation Front
At age 16, she was tasked by her father to head the MNLF National Identification Committee which deals the with the group's membership cards. She also served as Deputy Head of the MNLF Peace Coordinating Committee.

Bangsamoro government
Misuari along with her stepbrother Abdulkarim Misuari was appointed to the Bangsamoro Transition Authority Parliament by President Bongbong Marcos on August 12, 2022.

References

Members of the Bangsamoro Transition Authority Parliament
1994 births
Living people
Filipino Muslims
Tausūg people
Moro National Liberation Front members